Gil Cuadros (July 22, 1962 – August 29, 1996) was an American gay poet, essayist, and ceramist known for his writing on the impact of AIDS.

Biography 

Cuadros grew up in Montebello, California with parents from Northern California. He did not have a close relationship with his father. He attended Schurr High School, where he met photographer Laura Aguilar, with whom he remained close friends throughout his life. After high school, Gil Cuadros attended East Los Angeles Community College for one year before transferring to Pasadena City College. Cuadros worked at a photo lab where he met his lover, John Edward Milosch. In 1987, Milosch died and Cuadros was diagnosed with AIDS.

Laura Aguilar encouraged Cuadros to attend Terry Wolverton's writing workshops for people with HIV at the Los Angeles Gay and Lesbian Center, which Cuadros did in 1988, igniting a passion for writing. Despite initially being told that he had six months to live, Cuadros lived for eight years after his diagnosis, stating that "writing literally saved my life or at least extended my life."

Cuadros won the Brody Literature Fellowship, in 1991 and he was one of the first recipients of PEN Center USA/West grants to writers with HIV. Cuadros’ only book, City of God was published in 1994.

Cuadros died of AIDS at age 34, on August 29, 1996. Joshua Guzman writes that Cuadros' literature made an impact on the history of AIDS by providing a testimonial that "explores the impact that AIDS has had on the gay Chicano community."

Themes 
Cuadros' only published book-length work of fiction, City of God, and other of his works are considered the first of their kind to serve as testimonials for Chicanos with AIDS. Throughout his works and especially in City of God (1994), Cuadros gives visibility to two identities that are often denied within the Chicano community: homosexuality and having AIDS. Cuadros plays on the themes of sex, death, and home.

Commentaries 
José Monteagudo, Rafael Ocasio, Raúl Homero Villa, and Rafael Pérez-Torres have expressed that Gil Cuadros' work has yet to be fully recognized and valued. Raúl Homero Villa has expressed that Cuadros literary output has given readers queer insights into the changing space of East Los Angeles as well as its "fractured Chicano geography." José Monteagudo has dedicated his time in producing a review of City of God (1994). Rafael Ocasio argued that the AIDS testimonial of Cuadros' and Cuban exile writer, Reinaldo Arenas, have both provided their respective communities narratives a "foundation" served to empower. Rafael Pérez-Torres has asserted that Cuadros' work "is illustrative of the vexed intersection of race and queer sexuality."

City of God (1994) 
City of God consists of fictional short stories and poems. The title of the book derives from Saint Augustine's City of God, published in 426 AD. The book is thematically broken into three groups of three. Each group depicts different ages and phases of a single life lived by different characters. The first three stories "Indulgences", "Reynaldo",  and "Chilvalry" talk about issues of origin. That is, how childhood experiences shape "sexual and gender identification". Furthermore, these first three stories depict the Chicano family and growing up queer in Los Angeles. The next group, "My Aztlan: White Place", "Unprotected", and "Holy" speak about the difficulties that arise when homosexuality intersects with the Chicano self such as familial opposition. The last three stories "Baptism", "Letting Go", and "Sight" discusses the transformation the Chicano body undergoes as it faces the effects of a ravaging disease. The book, Rafael Pérez-Torres states, that the stories trace the "development and transformation of a new mestizo subject, one forced to accommodate an ethnic identity and experience with an alienating but crucial sexual identity". Overall, City of God (1994) provides its readers a better understand of the historical background of AIDS in the United States during the 1980-1990s. Beyond that, City of God (1994) presents its readers a unique perspective of gay history through the Chicano Movement.

AIDS and Los Angeles 
The book not only depicts the characters' experiences shaped by their surroundings but also readers see that characters "merge with the city." For Cuadros (fictional character), the city is his Aztlán, or Mecca. Although Aztlán refers to the mythical Aztec homeland that the Chicano Movement in the 1960-1970s to ascribed to as a place of communal belonging, Cuadros paints Aztlán, or Los Angeles, as a dystopia. In the story, any representations of Los Angeles are analogous to that of the character's AIDS-infected body. For example, "I look like the city, / only bare bones of what I used to be." Los Angeles is also portrayed through Saint Augustine's "earthly city of eternal misery." The queer community in Los Angeles is also depicted to reflect the dominant culture of the white middle class.

Works

Books 
City of God (1994)

Appearances 
Indivisible: New Short Fiction by West Coast Gay and Lesbian Writers (1991) 
High Risk 2: Writings on Sex, Death and Subversion (1994) 
Blood Whispers: L.A. Writers on AIDS, Volume 1 (1994)
The Soho Press Book of 80s Short Fiction, Dale Peck, Ed, Soho Press (2016)

Further reading

References

LGBT Hispanic and Latino American people
Hispanic and Latino American poets
American writers of Mexican descent
American gay artists
American male poets
American ceramists
American essayists
20th-century American poets
1962 births
1996 deaths
20th-century American male writers
American male essayists
20th-century ceramists
20th-century essayists
AIDS-related deaths in California
20th-century American LGBT people